Esslingen is a railway station in the Swiss canton of Zürich and the municipality of Egg. It is the outer terminus of the Forchbahn (FB) from the city of Zürich, which is operated as Zürich S-Bahn service S18. The station is operated by the Forchbahn, and has three terminal platforms and a bus interchange located under an overall roof. It serves the village of Esslingen.

The Forchbahn was originally opened as a roadside electric tramway, and has been progressively upgraded into a modern electric railway. Between the Forchbahn's opening in 1912 and 1949, it connected at Esslingen with the Uster–Oetwil tramway (UOeB), another similar roadside tramway that closed in 1949. The stop both lines shared was situated to the east of the existing station near the junction of Löwenstrasse and Usterstrasse, and is still marked by the presence of the Restaurant Bahnhof. The line's terminus was relocated to its current site in 1995.

Today the station provides interchange with buses on route 842 of the Verkehrsbetriebe Zürichsee und Oberland, which links Uster and Oetwil am See and replaces the UOeB.

References

External links 
 

Railway stations in Switzerland opened in 1995
Railway stations in the canton of Zürich